"So Blue" is a 1927 song written by Buddy DeSylva, Lew Brown, and Ray Henderson. The song has been covered by numerous artists and popular recordings in 1927 were by Paul Whiteman (vocal by Austin Young), Vincent Lopez (vocal by Frank Munn) and by Nick Lucas.

Other versions
Vera Lynn - on her album Vera Lynn Sings...Songs of the Twenties (1959).
Peggy Lee, on her album Dream Street (1957)
John Warren's Strictempo Orchestra 1959, 
The Cambridge Strings
Phil Tate And His Orchestra 1959 
The Diplomats, in a Vitaphone short
The Vibrations 1960

References

1927 songs
Songs with lyrics by Buddy DeSylva
Songs with lyrics by Lew Brown
Songs with music by Ray Henderson